Where the Light Shines Through is the tenth studio album by American rock band Switchfoot, released on July 8, 2016. The album was recorded in the band's recording studio Spot X in their hometown San Diego, and produced by Switchfoot and John Fields, with whom the band has worked on their breakthrough album The Beautiful Letdown (2003) and its follow-ups, Nothing Is Sound (2005) and Oh! Gravity. (2006). It is Switchfoot's first and only album to be released through Vanguard Records.

Promotion
On March 10, 2016, Switchfoot released a behind-the-scenes video showing the band working on their tenth studio album.
Album title and release date were officially announced on May 12, 2016.
Later the same day, the band released a trailer for the album, and a music video for an acoustic version of "Live It Well" onto YouTube. "Float" was released to radio on May 18, 2016. An official music video for "Float", filmed in Manila, was released at 6:00a.m. Pacific Time on May 25, 2016. The band premiered the title track "Where the Light Shines Through" on June 3, 2016, at the Del Mar Fair in San Diego, CA. Six days later, they released the official studio recording of the same track on iTunes.

Track listing

Personnel

Switchfoot
Jon Foreman – lead vocals, guitar
Tim Foreman – bass guitar, background vocals
Chad Butler – drums, percussion
Jerome Fontamillas – keyboards, guitar
Drew Shirley – guitar

Technical
Switchfoot – production
John Fields – production
Lenny Skolnik − additional production 
Joseph Barba − additional production 
Tanner Sparks – engineering, mixing
Paul David Hager – mixing

Additional musicians
Lecrae – vocals 
Eric Owyoung − strings 
Keith Tutt II − cello section 
John Painter − horns 
Boaz Roberts − guitar 
Robert Randolph − pedal steel 
Sam Dark – oboe

Charts

Weekly charts

Year-end charts

References

2016 albums
Switchfoot albums
Albums produced by John Fields (record producer)
Albums produced by Switchfoot
Vanguard Records albums